Kvik Halden FK is a Norwegian football club, founded on 19 June 1906.

The club plays in the 2. divisjon after their promotion from the 2018 3. divisjon. In 2010 they contested a playoff to win promotion, and succeeded by beating Eik-Tønsberg 5–1 on aggregate.

In 1997, a merger between the two Halden-based clubs FK Kvik and Halden FK resulted in the formation of Kvik Halden FK. Long before the merger, FK Kvik was informally known as Kvik Halden anyway, to avoid confusion with the other FK Kvik from Trondheim. FK Kvik was the older and better of the two, but Halden FK had a rather large base of young players. The merger was controversial, and has been criticized by some who claim that the result of the merger was that FK Kvik simply took over Halden FK.

Kvik Halden's only major trophy came in 1918, when the club (then FK Kvik) won the Norwegian Cup, defeating Brann in the final. FK Kvik also played two other Cup Finals, in 1915 and 1922, but lost both, each time to Odd.

The 1910s and 1920s was Kvik's glory days. In this period, the club had several players on the national team, and was one of the top clubs in Norwegian football. However, since the end of World War II, the team has never played in the highest football division, making Halden the second-largest town in Norway (behind Arendal) that has never had a top-division football team since a national league competition was established in 1948.

Honours
Norwegian Cup: 
Winners (1): 1918
Runners-up (2): 1915, 1922

Recent history 
{|class="wikitable"
|-bgcolor="#efefef"
! Season
! 
! Pos.
! Pl.
! W
! D
! L
! GS
! GA
! P
!Cup
!Notes
|-
|2009
|3. divisjon
|align=right |1
|align=right|26||align=right|23||align=right|2||align=right|1
|align=right|99||align=right|9||align=right|71
||Second round
|Lost play-off match for promotion
|-
|2010
|3. divisjon
|align=right bgcolor=#DDFFDD| 1
|align=right|26||align=right|22||align=right|3||align=right|1
|align=right|125||align=right|31||align=right|69
||First qualifying round
|Promoted to the 2. divisjon
|-
|2011 
|2. divisjon
|align=right |5
|align=right|26||align=right|12||align=right|6||align=right|8
|align=right|52||align=right|34||align=right|42
||Second round
|
|-
|2012
|2. divisjon
|align=right |5
|align=right|26||align=right|11||align=right|6||align=right|9
|align=right|53||align=right|40||align=right|39
||Third round
|
|-
|2013
|2. divisjon
|align=right |5
|align=right|26||align=right|12||align=right|5||align=right|9
|align=right|34||align=right|35||align=right|41
||Third round 
|
|-
|2014
|2. divisjon
|align=right |10
|align=right|26||align=right|9||align=right|4||align=right|13
|align=right|37||align=right|51||align=right|31
||First round
|
|-
|2015
|2. divisjon
|align=right |3
|align=right|26||align=right|16||align=right|5||align=right|5
|align=right|59||align=right|25||align=right|53
||Fourth round
|
|-
|2016 
|2. divisjon
|align=right bgcolor="#FFCCCC"| 9
|align=right|26||align=right|10||align=right|6||align=right|10
|align=right|47||align=right|50||align=right|36
||Second round
|Relegated to the 3. divisjon
|-
|2017
|3. divisjon
|align=right | 3
|align=right|26||align=right|15||align=right|4||align=right|7
|align=right|77||align=right|36||align=right|49
||Second round
|
|-
|2018
|3. divisjon
|align=right bgcolor=#DDFFDD| 1
|align=right|26||align=right|20||align=right|3||align=right|3
|align=right|65||align=right|16||align=right|63
||First round
|Promoted to the 2. divisjon
|-
|2019 
|2. divisjon
|align=right |2
|align=right|26||align=right|18||align=right|4||align=right|4
|align=right|57||align=right|26||align=right|58
||Second round
|
|-
|2020 
|2. divisjon
|align=right |5
|align=right|17||align=right|9||align=right|2||align=right|6
|align=right|37||align=right|31||align=right|29
||Cancelled
|
|-
|2021
|2. divisjon
|align=right |7
|align=right|26||align=right|12||align=right|5||align=right|9
|align=right|46||align=right|48||align=right|41
||First round
|
|-
|2022
|2. divisjon
|align=right |5
|align=right|24||align=right|10||align=right|4||align=right|10
|align=right|43||align=right|36||align=right|34
||Second round
|
|}
Source:

References

External links
Official website

Football clubs in Norway
Association football clubs established in 1906
Sport in Halden
1906 establishments in Norway